During the 2003–04 English football season, Sunderland A.F.C. competed in the Football League First Division.

Season Summary
While the dismal ending to the previous season, combined with losses in their opening two matches lead to fears that Sunderland might spend the season battling a second successive relegation, a run of 7 wins from their next 10 matches quickly ended any such fears. A couple of spells of indifferent form meant that the club didn't convincingly challenge for automatic promotion until the closing stages of the season, and then another poor run of form in the season's closing stages, including the loss of a six-pointer to fellow promotion hopefuls West Bromwich Albion, just as quickly ended any such hopes. Sunderland were still considered favourites going into the play-offs, but a loss on penalties to Crystal Palace, who had gate-crashed the play-offs on the final day of the season, meant a second season in Division One (or, as it would be re-branded the following season, the Championship).

Transfers

In

Summer

January

Out

Summer

January

Players

First-team squad
Squad at end of season

Left club during season

Reserves
The following players did not appear for the first-team this season.

Results
Sunderland's score comes first.

League Cup

FA Cup

Football League First Division

League table

Results summary

Results by matchday

Football League First Division play-offs

Goal scorers

References

McCarthy vows to keep Arca - http://news.bbc.co.uk/sport1/hi/football/teams/c/celtic/3349923.stm

Sunderland want Jon Stead - http://news.bbc.co.uk/sport1/hi/football/teams/s/sunderland/3410371.stm

Notes

Sunderland A.F.C. seasons
Sunderland